Politics of Saint Helena takes place in a framework of limited self-government as a dependent territory of the United Kingdom, whereby the governor is the head of government. Saint Helena, an island in the southern Atlantic Ocean, is a part of the British overseas territory of Saint Helena, Ascension and Tristan da Cunha.

It has had its present constitution since 1 September 2009. Executive power is exercised by the governor and the Executive Council. Legislative power is vested in both the governor and the Legislative Council. The judiciary is independent of the executive and the legislature. Military defence is the responsibility of the United Kingdom.

Saint Helena had until 2009 two dependencies: Ascension Island and Tristan da Cunha. These territories have their own political structures with Administrators under the governor of Saint Helena. They are now equal parts of Saint Helena, Ascension and Tristan da Cunha along with St Helena itself.

Executive branch

|align=left|Monarch
|Charles III 
|
|8 September 2022
|-
|Governor and Commander-in-Chief
|Nigel Phillips
|
|13 August 2022
|}

The Executive Council consists of the governor, three ex officio officers (one, the attorney general, having no vote), and five elected members of the Legislative Council. The monarch is the reigning monarch of the United Kingdom and is hereditary; the governor is appointed by the monarch on the advice of the British government. The chief secretary is the main advisor to the governor on the island and runs the administrative side of the government, which is based at The Castle in the capital, Jamestown.

Currently, the five elected members of the Legislative Council (along with the committees they were selected to chair on) who now serves on the Executive Council are:
 Lawson Arthur Henry (Economic Development Committee)
 Christine Scipio-O'Dean (Education Committee)
 Derek Franklin Thomas (Public Health Committee)
 Anthony Green (Social and Community)
 Russell Yon (Environment & Natural)

In January 2013 it was proposed that the Executive Council would be led by a "chief councillor" who would be elected by the members of the Legislative Council and would nominate the other members of the Executive Council. These proposals were put to a referendum on 23 March 2013 where they were defeated by 158 votes to 42 on a 10% turnout.

Legislative branch
The Legislative Council has 15 members, 12 members elected for a four-year term by popular vote and 3 members ex officio. This arrangement gives the governing of Saint Helena an aspect of representative democracy.

Political parties and elections
Saint Helena, along with both Ascension Island and Tristan da Cunha, does not have any active political parties, but no law forbids the formation of political parties; hence, the territory is a de facto non-partisan democracy. The Saint Helena Labour Party and Saint Helena Progressive Party existed until 1976.

In the most recent general election, the twelve elected members are:
 Julie Dorne Thomas (888 votes)
 Andrew James Turner (834 votes)
 Corinda Sebastiana Stuart Essex (827 votes)*
 Martin Dave Henry (750 votes)
 Jeffrey Robert Ellick (688 votes)*
 Ronald Arthur Coleman (678 votes)
 Karl Gavin Thrower (611 votes)
 Gillian Ann Brooks (561 votes)
 Mark Alan Brooks (533 votes)
 Christine Lilian Scipio (532 votes)*
 Robert Charles Midwinter (485 votes)
 Rosemary June Bargo (456 votes)

 An asterisk (*) denotes a sitting incumbent MLC who was duly re-elected.

Judicial branch
The territory has four courts of its own:

Court of Appeal
Supreme Court
Magistrates Court
Juvenile Court

The Judicial Committee of the Privy Council, in London, is the final court of appeal for the territory however, as is the case with all other British overseas territories.

International organization participation
ITUC

References